Ranganathittu Bird Sanctuary (also known as Pakshi Kashi of Karnataka), is a bird sanctuary in the Mandya District of the state of Karnataka in India. It is the largest bird sanctuary in the state,  in area, and comprises six islets on the banks of the Kaveri river. The sanctuary has been designated as a protected Ramsar site since 2022.

The sanctuary attracted about 3 lakh visitors during 2016–17.

History of the Park 
Ranganathittu's islets were formed when an embankment across the Kaveri river was built between 1645 and 1648 by the then king of Mysore, Kanteerava Narasimharaja Wadiyar. These islets, originally numbering 25, soon started attracting birds. The ornithologist Salim Ali observed that the islets formed an important nesting ground for a large variety of birds, and persuaded the king of Mysore to declare the area a protected area in 1940. The sanctuary is currently maintained by the Forest Department of Karnataka and efforts are ongoing to improve the sanctuary, including purchasing nearby private land to expand the protected area. In 2014, around 28 square km around the sanctuary was declared as an eco-sensitive zone, meaning that certain commercial activities cannot take place without the government’s permission.

Flooding 
The sanctuary with its islets experience heavy flooding during certain rainy seasons when water is released from Krishna Raja Sagara dam upstream, due to heavy rains. During heavy flooding boating is suspended and tourists are allowed to watch the nesting birds from a distance. Frequent flooding has also damaged some portions of three islands over past few decades.

Natural History of the Park

Biomes 
Most of the park is within a riparian area.

Flora 
Riverine reed beds cover the banks of the islands, while the islands themselves are covered in broadleaf forests, with dominant species being Terminalia arjuna (Arjun tree), bamboo groves, and Pandanus trees. Eucalyptus and acacia trees have also been planted, which might lead to long-term eradication of native species. The endemic and threatened lily  Iphigenia mysorensis of the family Colchicaceae also grows in the sanctuary.

Fauna

Birds 
Roughly 170 bird species have been recorded. Of these, the painted stork, Asian openbill stork, common spoonbill, woolly-necked stork, black-headed ibis, lesser whistling duck, Indian shag, stork-billed kingfisher, egret, cormorant, Oriental darter, spot-billed pelican and heron breed at Ranganathittu regularly. The great stone plover, and river tern also nest there, while the park is also home to a large flock of streak-throated swallows. Ranganathittu is a popular nesting site and about 8,000 nestlings were sighted during June 2011. About 50 pelicans have made Ranganathittu their permanent home.

During winter months, starting from mid-December, as many as 40,000 birds congregate at Ranganathittu, some migrating from Siberia, Latin America and parts of north India. 
During January and February, more than 30 species of migratory birds can be found in the sanctuary.

Other Fauna 
The islands are host to numerous small mammals including bonnet macaque, smooth coated otter, colonies of flying fox and common small mammals such as common palm civet and Indian gray mongoose. Additionally, there is a population of monitor lizards. The mugger crocodile or marsh crocodile is a common inhabitant of the riverine reed beds and Ranganathittu has largest fresh water crocodile population in Karnataka state.

Activities 
Ranger-guided boat tours of the isles are available throughout the day, and are a good way to watch birds, crocodiles, otters, and bats. There is no lodging within the sanctuary, so visitors typically stay over at Mysuru or Srirangapatna. The seasons for visiting the park are June–November (during the nesting season of the water birds). The best time to watch migratory birds is usually December but it can vary year to year.

The Salim Ali Interpretation Centre, maintained by Forest Department, screens a 4- minute documentary to special interest groups.

Accessibility 
Nearest Town: Srirangapatna (3 km)
Nearest City: Mysuru (19 km)
Nearest Railhead: Srirangapatna
Nearest Airport: Mysore Airport (25 km)
Nearest Highway: Bangalore – Mysuru highway (2 km)

Gallery

References

External links 

 Ranganathittu Bird Sanctuary- A Report

 

Bird sanctuaries of Karnataka
South Deccan Plateau dry deciduous forests
Villages in Mandya district
Srirangapatna
Protected areas established in 1940
1940 establishments in India
Ramsar sites in India